Kandis is a Danish dansband made up of Johnny Hansen, Jørgen Hein Jørgensen, Michael Krätz and Jens Erik Jensen. Formed in 1989, Kandis scored their biggest hit in 1993, "En lille ring af guld," which topped the Danish Danse Charts for a total of 33 weeks.

Their albums regularly chart in the Top 5 of the Danish Albums Chart, such as 2008's Kandis 12 or 2011's Kandis 14.

Lead singer and guitarist Johnny Hansen, also has a solo career releasing various albums like Godmorgen verden (1999), Lidt efter lidt (2001) and Mit ferieparadis (2006)

Discography
(For Johnny Hansen separate solo discography, see Johnny Hansen)

Albums
(Selective listing. In parenthesis, top positions in the Danish Albums Chart)

Live albums

Compilation albums

Singles
1993: "En lille ring af guld"

References

External links 
 

Danish musical groups
Dansbands